Rathish Ambat is an Indian film director, adfilm director, and producer who works predominantly in the Malayalam film industry. He is well known for his debut film Kammara Sambhavam which was released on 14 April 2018.

Career
Rathish started his career as an ad filmmaker. In 2013 Ratish Ambat co-produced the film Ezhu Sundara Rathrikal directed by Lal Jose. In 2015, Rathish's most popular project ‘The Great Backwaters' campaign for the Kerala Tourism board to promote the backwaters of Kerala went on to fetch the Silver at the Golden Gate awards at the Internationale Tourismus-Börse Berlin (ITB-Berlin). He made his directional movie debut through the Malayalam movie Kammara Sambhavam which has won the National Film Award for Best Production Design and the Kerala State Film Awards for Best Costume Designer and Best Art Director. He called the film "a satire that has politics, history and cinema". The film won an award at the 66th National Film Awards. He was the co-producer of the film Ezhu Sundara Rathrikal by Lal Jose. His second film Theerppu as a director and co-producer starring Prithviraj, Isha Talwar, and Indrajith and is scheduled to release in January 2022. In late 2021, he was reported to be working on an anthology called 'Mindscapes' written by M.T. Vasudevan Nair. It is also the first project in Malayalam to be produced by Netflix.

Filmography

Awards
 ITB Berlin Golden Gate Award, Kerala Tourism Ad film - 2015.

References

External links
 

Living people
Malayalam film directors
Year of birth missing (living people)